Fitz-Hugh–Curtis syndrome is a rare complication of pelvic inflammatory disease (PID) involving liver capsule inflammation leading to the creation of adhesions. The condition is named after the two physicians, Thomas Fitz-Hugh, Jr and Arthur Hale Curtis who first reported this condition in 1934 and 1930 respectively.

Signs and symptoms
The major symptom and signs include an acute onset of right upper quadrant (RUQ) abdominal pain aggravated by breathing, coughing or laughing, which may be referred to the right shoulder.  There is usually also tenderness on palpation of the right upper abdomen and tenderness to percussion of the lower ribs which protect the liver.  Surprisingly there is often no or only minimal pelvic pain, vaginal discharge or cervical motion tenderness, which may lead to the diagnosis being missed.  This may be due to infectious bacteria bypassing pelvic structures on the way to the liver capsule.

Pathophysiology
Fitz-Hugh–Curtis syndrome occurs almost exclusively in women. It is usually caused by Chlamydia trachomatis (Chlamydia) or Neisseria gonorrhoeae (Gonorrhea) though other bacteria such as Bacteroides, Gardnerella, E. coli and Streptococcus have also been found to cause Fitz-Hugh-Curtis syndrome on occasion. These bacterial pathogens  cause a thinning of cervical mucus and allow bacteria from the vagina into the uterus and fallopian tubes, causing infection and inflammation. Occasionally, this inflammation can cause scar tissue to form on Glisson's capsule, a thin layer of connective tissue surrounding the liver.(Bailey&Love)

Diagnosis
Abdominal ultrasound will typically be normal. Liver function tests will typically be normal or unchanged from baseline as the infection does not involve the liver parenchyma. If a D-dimer is ordered, which it often is when there is pleuritic torso pain, it will usually be markedly elevated but other testing for pulmonary embolism will be normal. CT of the abdomen with IV contrast may show subtle enhancement of the liver capsule, but this may be missed by radiologists if they are not advised to look for it. Testing for gonorrhea and chlamydia should be performed to make the diagnosis.  An endocervical or low vaginal swab should be taken to test for these organisms. Antibody testing is rarely required but may be considered if other tests are non-diagnostic and suspicion is high.Laparoscopy is also rarely required, but may be performed when the diagnosis is uncertain and may reveal "guitar string" adhesions of parietal peritoneum to liver.

Treatment 
Treatment involves a course of antibiotics to cover the appropriate organisms, typically ceftriaxone plus azithromycin. The underlying infection may be treated using various regimens consisting of tetracycline, doxycycline, ofloxacin, metronidazole, and other antibiotics. Analgesics such as acetaminophen and codeine may be used to relieve pain. Laparoscopy for lysis of adhesions may be performed for refractory pain.

References

Further reading

External links 

Bacterial diseases
Gynaecologic disorders
Syndromes in females
Rare syndromes
Rare infectious diseases
Gonorrhea